Isabella of France (1295 – 22 August 1358) was Queen of England and the daughter of Philip IV of France. Sometimes called the "She-Wolf of France", she was a key figure in the rebellion which deposed her husband, Edward II of England, in favor of their eldest son Edward III. This event, as well as Isabella's affair with Roger Mortimer and Edward II's relationships with Piers Gaveston and Hugh Despenser the Younger, have prompted Isabella's portrayal multiple times in literature and visual media.

Theatre and poetry
 Edward II (c. 1592), play by Christopher Marlowe
 Mortimer His Fall (1641), an unfinished play by Ben Jonson
 The Bard (1757), poem by Thomas Gray
 L'assedio di Calais (The Siege of Calais) (1836), opera in three acts by Gaetano Donizetti
 The Life of Edward II of England (1923), play by Bertolt Brecht based on Marlowe's play
 Edward II (1995), ballet in two acts based on Marlowe's play, directed by David Bintley with music by John McCabe

Novels
 Les Rois maudits (The Accursed Kings), a French historical novel series by Maurice Druon, in particular:
 Le Roi de fer (The Iron King) (1955)
 La Louve de France (The She-Wolf of France) (1959)
 Le Lys et le lion (The Lily and the Lion) (1960)
 Isabel the Fair (1957) by Margaret Campbell Barnes
 Harlot Queen (1970) by Hilda Lewis
 Lord of Misrule (1972) by Eve Trevaskis
 The Queen and Mortimer (1974) by Brenda Honeyman
 The King's Minions (1974) by Brenda Honeyman (prequel to The Queen and Mortimer)
 She-Wolf (1975) by Pamela Bennetts
 Where Nobles Tread (1975) by Janet Kilbourne
 King's Wake (1977) by Eve Trevaskis
 Brittle Glory (1977) by Jean Evans
 A Love So Bold (1978) historical romance by Annelise Kamada
 The Follies of the King (1980) by Jean Plaidy (Book 8 in the Plantagenet series)
 The Gascon (1984) by John Colin Penford
 Isabella, the She-Wolf (1985) by Maureen Peters
 Gaveston (1992) by Chris Hunt
 Letter from Poitou (2004) by Michael Eardley
 The Traitor's Wife: A Novel of the Reign of Edward II (2005) by Susan Higginbotham
 Mathilde of Westminster, an historical mystery series by Paul C. Doherty:
 The Cup of Ghosts (2005)
 The Poison Maiden (2007)
 The Darkening Glass (2009)
 Queen of Shadows (2006) by Edith Felber
 Knights Templar Mysteries, a series by Michael Jecks, in particular:
 The Templar, the Queen and Her Lover (2007)
 The Oath (2010)
 King’s Gold (2011)
 The Ruling Passion (2008) by David Pownall
 The King's Mistress (2010) by Emma Campion
 Isabella: Braveheart of France (2013) by Colin Falconer
 Gate of the Dead (2016) by David Gilman
 To Calais, in Ordinary Time (2019) by James Meek.

Television, film and radio
 Edward II (1970), BBC TV adaptation of Marlowe's play directed by Richard Marquand and Tony Robertson; Isabella is portrayed by Diane Fletcher
 Les Rois maudits (1972), French miniseries adaptation of the Druon novels directed by Claude Barma; Isabella is portrayed by 
 Edward II (1982), French TV film adaptation Marlowe's play directed by Bernard Sobel; Isabella is portrayed by Hélène Vincent
 Edward II (1991), film based on Marlowe's play and directed by Derek Jarman; Isabella is portrayed by Tilda Swinton
 Braveheart (1995), film directed by Mel Gibson; Isabella is portrayed by Sophie Marceau
 Les Rois maudits (2005), French miniseries adaptation of the Druon novels directed by Josée Dayan; Isabella is portrayed by Julie Gayet
 The Ruling Passion (2008), audio presentation of Pownall's novel in 10 episodes of the BBC Radio 4 programme Book at Bedtime, read by David Horovitz
 World Without End (2012), miniseries directed by Michael Caton-Jones; Isabella is portrayed by Aure Atika (the miniseries is based on the 2007 Ken Follett novel of the same name in which Isabella does not appear)
Knightfall (2017), television series about the Knights Templar; Isabella is portrayed by Sabrina Bartlett as a main character in season one, and by Genevieve Gaunt as a recurring character in season two.

Illuminated manuscript illustrations

References

Cultural depictions of English queens
Cultural depictions of French women
Edward II of England